The  is one of eleven proportional representation (PR) blocks for the House of Representatives in the Diet of Japan. It consists of the Tōhoku region, namely the prefectures of Aomori, Iwate, Miyagi, Akita, Yamagata and Fukushima. Upon the introduction of proportional voting at the 1996 general election, the block elected 16 Representatives to the House. The block's representation was reduced to 14 Representatives at the 2000 general election, and to 13 in the 2017 election.

Summary of results 
All major national parties have managed to obtain at least one of the PR seats in Tōhoku since the introduction of proportional voting in 1996. The region also contains several strongholds: Aomori in particular is a typical "conservative kingdom" and leans towards the LDP along with the Western prefectures along the Sea of Japan coast; Iwate is the home of Ichirō Ozawa, former NFP, LP and DPJ president and a "Democratic kingdom" having also the first prefectural parliament in Japan where the Democrats managed to obtain the status of strongest party in 2007.

List of representatives

Recent results 
 #: List rank assigned by the party
 District column: For double candidates who concurrently ran in a single-member electoral district, the district column contains the electoral district where they stood and the sekihairitsu (lit. "narrow defeat ratio"), the ratio of margin of defeat. It determines the ranking of candidates who are put on the same list rank by their party.
 (in parentheses): Double candidates who are not eligible for election in the proportional block either because they won their district races or were disqualified for having received less than 10% of the vote in the district race (also the threshold for losing the deposit)

 2014 

 2012 

 2009

References 

 JANJAN, The Senkyo: Results of general and by-elections for the House of Representatives 1890–2010

Tōhoku region
PR Tohoku